Bizhovtsi may refer to the following places in Bulgaria:

Bizhovtsi, Gabrovo Province
Bizhovtsi, Veliko Tarnovo Province